The short-tailed grasswren (Amytornis merrotsyi) is a species of bird in the family Maluridae. It is endemic to Australia.  Its natural habitats are temperate shrubland and rocky areas.

Subspecies 
Two subspecies are recognized:
 A. m. merrotsyi – Mellor, 1913: found on Flinders Ranges, South Australia
 A. m. pedleri – Christidis, Horton & Norman, 2008: found on Gawler Ranges, South Australia

References

short-tailed grasswren
Birds of South Australia
Endemic birds of Australia
short-tailed grasswren
Taxonomy articles created by Polbot